Jesús Mora may refer to:
Jesuli (born Jesús Antonio Mora Nieto), a Spanish footballer
Jesús Mora (baseball), a Venezuelan ballplayer
Jesus Mora (artist), a 2011 Guggenheim Fellowship recipient (see GF profile)